Fleetwood Academy, founded in 1839 by Oliver White, was a military school for boys located in King and Queen County, Virginia, six miles north of Bruington Baptist Church. The Academy buildings consisted of a two-story schoolhouse and three one-story dormitories. Modeling itself after the Virginia Military Institute, Fleetwood Academy was noted for offering courses in mathematics, Greek, French, and natural philosophy, with an estimated yearly enrollment of thirty-five to forty cadets. In 1848, the school was issued forty muskets by the Virginia government, to be used for instructing the students in military exercises. In operation for approximately twenty-two years, Fleetwood Academy closed in 1860. The Academy, its cadets, and its founder, Oliver White, were held in high regard by citizens of King and Queen County.

A section of The Beginnings of Public Education in Virginia, a book published in 1917 by A.J. Morrison, reads:
‘About the year 1839, a Scotchman of culture and wise forecast, came to us and established an academy at Fleetwood, some six miles above Bruington Church. This gentleman, Mr. White, deserves the everlasting gratitude of our people, within and beyond the borders of the county. He erected a standard which is telling today upon a number of pupils who do him honor.’

Notable alumni 
Robert Latane Montague, 4th Lieutenant Governor of Virginia

References 

Land and Heritage in the Virginia Tidewater: a History of King and Queen County by Barbara Kaplan

See also
List of defunct military academies in the United States

1860 disestablishments
Defunct United States military academies
Educational institutions established in 1839
King and Queen County, Virginia
Defunct schools in Virginia